The giant pika or Wharton's pika (Ochotona whartoni) is an extinct mammal species in the family Ochotonidae. It lived during the Pleistocene and early Holocene in northern parts of North America (Alaska, US and Canada). Very similar forms have also been found also in Siberia.

Distribution
The giant pika has been found in Alaska (United States), Yukon (O. whartoni and O cf. whartoni, large number of locations), Alberta and Ontario (Canada). A close relative O. whartoni (O. cf. whartoni) is also known from Eastern Siberia and Kolyma.

The ancestors of these pikas migrated from Eurasia to North America during the Early Pleistocene via the Bering Land Bridge, along with another group of small pikas close to the "O. pusilla group". This migration was separate from that of O. spanglei, which entered North America approximately three million earlier at the Miocene-Pliocene boundary.

Detailed fossil distribution
Canada
Old Crow River, Yukon, Irvingtonian (1.8 - 0.3 Ma) and Middle Pleistocene (0.8 - 0.1 Ma), O cf. whartoni and O. whartoni.
Old Crow River, Yukon, Late/Upper Pleistocene (Late Illinoian-Sangamonian stages)(0.1 - 0.0 Ma / ~125,000-80,000 BP), at least 10 locations, O. cf. whartoni
Thistle Creek, Yukon, Middle Pleistocene (0.8 - 0.1 Ma), O. whartoni
Eagle Cave, Alberta, >33,000 BP
Elba Cave at Elba, Ontario, 8670±220 BP  (the last known occurrence of this species)
Kelso Cave, Ontario, Late Wisconsian (>32,000 BP)
The large form of Ochotona was found in 2 of 5 localities in eastern North America.
United States
Cape Deceit, Alaska, Cape Deceit Formation, Irvingtonian (1.8 - 0.3 Ma), O. whartoni,(the species was discovered here)
Gold Hill Cut at Fairbanks, Alaska
Russia - only O cf. whartoni
From eastern Siberia - Zayarsk site to the Kolyma Range area (Krestovka Sections, Yakutia), in Kolyma from Late Cenozoic
Western Siberia, but  mentions only Ochotona as occurring there.

Biology
The giant pika is much larger than other North American pikas, but is of a similar size to the extinct early and middle Pleistocene O. complicidens and extant O. koslowi (Koslov's pika), both from China, and may belong to one of them. Unlike the American pika (O. princeps), which inhabits scree slopes, the giant pika's habitat was largely tundra and steppe, similar to Eurasian pikas.

Occurrence and extinction
The giant pika has been found in North America from the Irvingtonian (1.8–0.3 Ma, Lower–Middle Pleistocene) throughout Middle Pleistocene to Late Pleistocene (0.1–0.0Ma) locations.

The last occurrence of the giant pika is known from early the Holocene of eastern North America (a cave at Elba in the Niagara Escarpment, Ontario) and its radiometric date is 8670±220 years BP (14C age) or 10251-9140 BP (calibrated date). It is possible that it survived in the rocky areas along the Niagara Escarpment as a relict population.

Notes

References

Additional references of the Paleobiology Database

Pikas
Holocene extinctions
Prehistoric lagomorphs
Extinct animals of the United States
Extinct animals of Canada
Prehistoric mammals of North America
Fossil taxa described in 1971